Institut Saint Dominique is a private Catholic French international school in northern Rome, Italy, operated by the Congrégation Romaine de Saint Dominique.

The school, recognized as a French school by the AEFE, serves toute petite section (less than 3 years of age) until terminale, the final year of lycée (high school/sixth-form college).

It was established in the 1960s. It has a boarding facility open from Monday through Friday.

See also
 Istituto Statale Italiano Leonardo Da Vinci - The Italian school in Paris

References

External links
 Institut Saint Dominique 

International schools in Rome
French international schools in Italy
Catholic schools in Italy
Secondary schools in Italy
Boarding schools in Italy